Amotherby is a village and civil parish in the Ryedale district of North Yorkshire, England.

Description 
The village appears in the Domesday Book (1086) as 'Aimundrebi' which is derived from 'Eymund's farm'.

The 2001 census recorded a population of 357 for the parish, increasing to 399 at the 2011 Census. There is a Grade II listed church dedicated to St Helen.

Amotherby sits on two main roads, the B1257 between Helmsley and Malton and the Kirkbymoorside to Malton road. Both roads meet at a busy junction in the village, with traffic from Helmsley and Kirkbymoorside meeting towards Malton.

The village used to have a railway station on the Thirsk and Malton line. The station closed to passengers in 1930 but stayed open to goods until 1964.

The village is home to Malton Foods Ltd (formerly known as Westlers) which produces ready meals for the foodservice and retail sectors. The Company has been part of Zwanenberg Food Group UK since November 2013.

Governance 
An electoral ward in the same name exists. This ward stretches north to Kirby Misperton with a total population taken at the 2011 census of 2,032.

References

External links 
 
 Amotherby on ryedale.co.uk
 

Villages in North Yorkshire
Civil parishes in North Yorkshire